Vladimír Helfert (24 March 1886 in Plánice (near Klatovy) – 18 March 1945 in Prague) was a Czechslovak musicologist in the interwar period.  Although his early career as a music critic was clouded by the negative influence of his teacher, Zdeněk Nejedlý, with whom he studied at Charles University. After accepting a post in 1922 as professor of musicology at Masaryk University in Brno, he went against Nejedlý's teachings and championed the music of Leoš Janáček.  

His greatest work, Česká moderní hudba. Studie o české hudební tvořivosti (Czech Modern Music: A study of Czech musical creativity, 1936), came under public attack by Nejedlý and his remaining followers. During the Nazi occupation, Helfert became involved with the underground Czechoslovak Communist Party and was arrested for resistance activities.

He was interned in Brno's Špilberk Castle by the Gestapo in 1939, and subsequently in Wrocław until 1942.  After convalescing he was arrested again in 1944, and held in Prague's Pankrác prison and finally the Theresienstadt concentration camp:  his health did not survive the trip back to Prague after liberation.

References 

1886 births
1945 deaths
Czechoslovak musicologists
People from Plánice
Academic staff of Masaryk University
Czech people who died in the Theresienstadt Ghetto